"Je suis chez moi" is a song by French rapper Black M. It was released as the second single from his second studio album Éternel insatisfait. The song was a response to Marion Maréchal and the French far-right movements.

Music video 
The song's music video was released on 22 August 2016 as a short film written by Black M and directed by JHOS. It was shot in a countryside in a bus in France.

Controversy 
The music video became controversial due to a message written in Black M's t-shirt, which was in memory of Adama Traoré. When it aired on W9, the message was blurred.

Live performance 
Black M performed the song on the eighth season of Touche pas à mon poste!

Charts

References 

2016 singles
2016 songs
Black M songs
Songs written by Renaud Rebillaud
Songs written by Maska (rapper)